Gesomyrmex breviceps is a species of ant in the subfamily Formicinae.

References

Formicinae
Insects described in 2009